Below is a list of presidents of Trabzonspor.

References

Trabzonspor